The Wimaranga (Wimaragga), also known as the Yuupngati (Jupangati) or Nggerikudi, were an Indigenous Australian people of the western Cape York Peninsula in northern Queensland.

Language
Apart from the oral Jupangati language, the Jupangati employed a version of Australian sign language, and Walter Roth recorded some 24 examples in 1900.

Country
Their territory extended as far as Duyfken Point and included the Pennefather River district between Port Musgrave and Albatross Bay. To their south were the neighbouring Windawinda people.

Alternative names
There are in the ethnographic literature many names, or spelling variants, used to designate the Jupangati
 Yuupngati, Yupangati, Yupungati
 Yupnget, Yupungatti, Yopngadi
 Nggerikudi, Nggirikudi, Ngerikudi, Niggerikudi
 Ra:kudi
 Angadimi, Angutimi (These refer to the name used to refer to the language
 Batjana, Mbatyana, Ba:tyana (This was a name designating a horde on the lower Wenlock [Batavia] River)
 Wimarangga, Wimaranga (This referred to a horde near Duifken Point, on the north side of Albatross Bay).

Notes

Citations

Sources

Aboriginal peoples of Queensland